Dr. Clark House may refer to:

in the United States
Dr. John Clark House, Berea, Ohio, known also as Buehl House, listed on the National Register of Historic Places (NRHP)
John H. Clark House, Mechanicsburg, Ohio, listed on the NRHP in Champaign County as "Dr. Clark House"
 Dr. Clark House, Sycamore, Illinois, a contributing property in Sycamore Historic District

See also
Clark House (disambiguation)